The 2014 Grand Prix el Salvador was a one-day women's cycle  race held in El Salvador on March 8 2014 over 93.2 km from San Marcos to Zaragoza. The race has an UCI rating of 1.1 and was won by  the Belarusian Alena Amialiusik of Astana BePink.

Results

References

2014 in Salvadoran sport
2014 in women's road cycling
Grand Prix el Salvador